The City of Munno Para, formerly the District Council of Munno Para, was a local government area of South Australia from 6th November 1958 to 1997, seated at the township of Smithfield. In 1997 the City of Munno Para merged with the City of Elizabeth to form the new City of Playford.

Early years
District Council of Munno Para East was proclaimed on 10 November 1853 and expanded on 22 June 1933 by the amalgamation of the existing District Council of Munno Para East with a severed central portion of the District Council of Munno Para West.The first meeting of the expanded District Council was held at Uley on Monday 3 July 1933. On 6th November 1958 eventually  'East' was dropped from the name following some further boundary changes in the west with the District Council of Salisbury in 1954.  The District Council bounded approximated an area known as the northern Para Plains, so called due to the proximity of the North Para, South Para and Little Para rivers.

Council Chambers and Office
The District Council of Munno Para East used the old Chapel on Uley Road at Uleybury as it Council Chamber. During the 1950s the Council Office was at 34 Murray Street Gawler until it moved to new building adjacent the Shopping Centre on Crittenden Road, Smithfield Plains.

Prior to the 1950s, most of the area surrounding the township of Smithfield was farming estates.

On 13 December 1984, The District Council of Munno Para passed the population threshold for City status and was renamed to City of Munno Para.. The Council Offices relocated from Smithfield Plains into a new Building and adjacent Library located on Warooka Drive, Smithfield next to Smith's Creek.

Mayors City of Munno Para

After being granted City status, the Chairperson role for the District Council became an Elected Mayor role.

John Joseph McVeity became the first Mayor of the City of Munno Para on 13 December 1984.

Jospehine (Jo) Gapper OAM became The City of Munno Para’s first elected Mayor in 1985. She served in successive terms until her retirement in 1995.

Martin Lindsell was elected Mayor in 1995 and served until the City of Munno Para merged with the City of Playford in 1997.

See also
 District Council of Munno Para East
 District Council of Munno Para West
 Hundred of Munno Para
 Munno Para, South Australia
 Munno Para railway station
 Munno Para Downs, South Australia
 Munno Para West, South Australia

Notes

Munno Para, City of
1933 establishments in Australia
1997 disestablishments in Australia